Ishak Haji Muhammad (14 November 1909 – 7 November 1991),  better known as Pak Sako, was a Malaysian writer, active in the 1930s until the 1950s. He was a nationalist and his involvement began before independence and continued thereafter. He fought for the idea of the unification of Melayu Raya where Indonesia, Malaysia and Brunei are united in one collective.

The moniker Pak Sako was from the title 'Isako-san' given to him by the Japanese, which was the phonetic pronunciation of his name in the Japanese tongue. Ishak's other pseudonyms include Anwar, Hantu Raya (The Great Ghost), Isako San and Pandir Moden (The Modern-day Pandir)

Early life 
Ishak was born in 1909 in Kampung Bukit Seguntang, Temerloh, Pahang and received his early education at the Kg. Tengah Malay School, Temerloh in 1919 and continued his education at the  Clifford High School, Kuala Lipis from 1924 to 1928. He received his certificate of education from the Raub English School in 1929.  In 1930, he went to the Malay College Kuala Kangsar (MCKK) to train as an officer in the Malayan Civil Service. He held posts as Assistant Deputy District Officer, a Class III Magistrate and a language teacher before entering the literary scene. He attended the Malayan Communist Party in 1941 before the Japanese Occupation of Malaya and became a central committee member of MCP along with Rashid Maidin, Ahmad Boestamam and Abdullah CD in Perak.

Writings and politics 
Ishak grew bored with his job as a British administrator and found the life of a British civil servant full of deception, favouritism and no interest in preserving the interests of the Malays who were said to have been given protection by the British. In 1934, he resigned from the Malayan Civil Service and travelled the peninsula Malaya. He later concentrated on nationalist literature and politics. He was imprisoned twice (1948–1953; 1965–1966).

Malay envoy 
Ishak was the first with the idea to publish the Utusan Melayu (The Malay Post) newspaper and subsequently became the founder of the publication. He left Warta Malaya (Malayan Times) and travelled to Pahang, Kelantan and Terengganu to campaign for the establishment of the Utusan Melayu Press. He worked at the paper under Abdul Rahim Kajai as editor. During the Japanese occupation of Malaya, he became the editor of Berita Malai (Malayan News).

He continued to live in Hulu Langat even though he worked in Kuala Lumpur. He would take the public transport to office. For a while, he did have a Fiat when he was working in Rembau, but he did not drive and had to hire a driver.

Literature 
Ishak produced many novels, short stories, essays and memoirs as well as writing articles for the Utusan Melayu Group's newspapers. The National Library of Malaysia has, in their collection, more than 1,000 copies of his literary work.

His two most well-known works are Putera Gunung Tahan (The Prince of Mount Tahan) and Anak Mat Lela Gila (The Son of Crazy Mat Lela), which reflected his views and aspirations as a patriot and writer. They were satire novels aimed at the British and also were a critique of the British. Ishak placed importance on Malay culture in his writings and glorified Malay culture by comparing it to English culture which is said to lack quality and is too aggressive. He was also active in short story-writing.

Below is a sample of his other works:
 Budak beca (Trishaw Boy). Marang: Mohamad bin A. Rahman, 1957
 Judi karan (The Electric Bet). Singapore: Geliga, 1958
 Pengantin baru (The Newlyweds). Singapore: Geliga

In his later years, he was more known as a columnist in Utusan Malaysia and Gila-Gila (a local satire magazine).

Awards 
As tribute for his contributions, the University of Malaya awarded him an Honorary Doctorate of Literature on 29 June 1973.  On 29 May 1976, Ishaak received the Pejuang Sastera (Literary Exponent) Award from the Prime Minister.

Death 
He died on 7 November 1991 at 5.40 am at his home in Kampung Bukit Raya, in Hulu Langat, Selangor. He was buried in his childhood village in Temerloh, after the Friday prayers, next to the graves of his parents, in accordance with his wishes. He had been admitted to the Tawakal Hospital on 18 October after suffering from a stroke, and had just left the hospital for two weeks before he died. Earlier in the year, he had suffered another stroke and was admitted to the Kuala Lumpur General Hospital on 22 July. That attack left his right side paralysed.

As tribute, UMNO donated RM16,874.15 to his family at the close of its General Assembly that year. RM10,000 came from the UMNO headquarters while the remainder was contributed by its delegates during the assembly. It was presented by the Prime Minister, Datuk Seri Dr. Mahathir Mohamad to the Chief Minister of Pahang, Tan Sri Khalil Yaacob to be given to his family.

Legacy
Several places and honours were named after him, including:
 Jalan Pak Sako, Temerloh, Pahang
 Kolej Pak Sako, Universiti Industri Selangor (UNISEL), Bestari Jaya, Selangor
 Akademi Pak Sako, Jalan Telawi, Bangsar, Kuala Lumpur

Notes

References 
 Harry Aveling, trans., Ishak Haji Muhammad: The Prince of Mount Tahan, Singapore: Heinemann Educational Books, (Asia), 1980.
 Harry Aveling, trans., Ishak Haji Muhammad: The Son of Mat Mat Lela, Singapore: Federal Books, 1983.
 Ishak Haji Muhammad, "Ilham Mencipta Putera Gunung Tahan", Dewan Sastera, 23 April 1976.

External links 
 Malaysian Armed Forces Library

1909 births
1991 deaths
People from Pahang
Malaysian Muslims
Malaysian people of Malay descent
Malaysian writers
Malaysian politicians
Malaysian socialists
Malaysian political party founders